Bomarea multiflora, the trailing lily, is a species of flowering plant in the alstroemeria family. It is a multi-stemmed vine native to Colombia and Ecuador.

It is an invasive plant species in New Zealand and is listed on the National Pest Plant Accord.

It can be grown outdoors in a sheltered spot in temperate zones, but does not tolerate being frozen. Alternatively it can be grown under glass. In cultivation in the UK it has won the Royal Horticultural Society's Award of Garden Merit.

See also

 List of plants known as lily

References

External links

multiflora
Flora of Colombia
Flora of Ecuador
Plants described in 1782